Ynysmaerdy is a village near Talbot Green and Llantrisant in Rhondda Cynon Taf, Wales. Even though there is no direct access to the village of Llanharan, due to older parish boundaries it falls under the community of Llanharan. It is home to the Royal Glamorgan Hospital.

Notes

Villages in Rhondda Cynon Taf
Llantrisant